Hazal Selin Arifoğlu (born August 18, 1992, in Ankara, Turkey) is a Turkish volleyball player. She plays for Kuzeyboru GSK.

Career
On 13 August 2020, she signed a 1-year contract with the Galatasaray Women's Volleyball Team.

References

External links
Player profile at Galatasaray.org
Player profile at Volleybox.net

1992 births
Sportspeople from Ankara
Living people
Turkish women's volleyball players
Galatasaray S.K. (women's volleyball) players
Aydın Büyükşehir Belediyespor volleyballers
Sarıyer Belediyesi volleyballers
Yeşilyurt volleyballers
Eczacıbaşı volleyball players
21st-century Turkish sportswomen